Petro Kostiantynovych Kravchuk (11 July 1962 – 3 August 2022) was a Ukrainian politician. A member of Ukraine – Forward!, he served as a People's Deputy of Ukraine from 2006 to 2008.

Kravchuk died on 3 August 2022, at the age of 60.

References

1962 births
2022 deaths
All-Ukrainian Union "Fatherland" politicians
Ukraine – Forward! politicians
Lviv Polytechnic alumni
People from Volyn Oblast
Fifth convocation members of the Verkhovna Rada
Sixth convocation members of the Verkhovna Rada